Szpakowski (feminine Szpakowska) is a Polish surname. Notable people with the surname include:

 Dariusz Szpakowski (born 1951), Polish sports commentator
 Michał Szpakowski (born 1989), Polish rower
 Ryszard Szpakowski (born 1951), Polish footballer

Polish-language surnames